Phyllis Florence Young (April 5, 1925 – March 17, 1984) was a Canadian politician. She served in the Legislative Assembly of British Columbia from 1972 to 1975, as a NDP member for the constituency of Vancouver-Little Mountain.

References

British Columbia New Democratic Party MLAs
1925 births
1984 deaths
American emigrants to Canada
Women government ministers of Canada
Members of the Executive Council of British Columbia
Politicians from Grand Rapids, Michigan
Politicians from Vancouver
Women MLAs in British Columbia
20th-century Canadian women politicians